Aiemann Zahabi (born November 19, 1987) is a Canadian mixed martial artist. He competes in the bantamweight division of the Ultimate Fighting Championship (UFC). Aiemann is the younger brother of Tristar Gym head trainer Firas Zahabi.

Mixed martial arts career

Early career
Before joining the UFC, Zahabi amassed a record of 6-0 with all of his wins coming by first round stoppages.

Ultimate Fighting Championship
Zahabi debuted at UFC Fight Night: Lewis vs. Browne against Reginaldo Vieira. He won the fight by unanimous decision.

In his second fight for the promotion, Zahabi faced Ricardo Ramos on November 4, 2017 at UFC 217. He lost the fight by knockout in the third round.

Zahabi faced Vince Morales on May 4, 2019 at UFC Fight Night 151. He lost the fight by unanimous decision.

Zahabi was expected to face promotional newcomer Drako Rodriguez on December 19, 2020 at UFC Fight Night 183. However Zahabi tested positive for COVID-19 and the bout was scratched, with no replacement being sought for Drako. The pair was rescheduled for UFC Fight Night 185 on February 20, 2021. At the weigh-ins, Rodriguez weighed in at 140.5 pounds, four and a half pounds over the bantamweight non-title fight limit. He was fined 30%  of his purse which went to his opponent Zahabi and the bout proceeded at catchweight. Zahabi won the fight via knockout in round one. This win earned him the Performance of the Night award.

Zahabi faced The Ultimate Fighter 29 bantamweight winner Ricky Turcios on July 9, 2022 at UFC on ESPN 39. He won the fight via unanimous decision.

Championships and accomplishments
Ultimate Fighting Championship
Performance of the Night (One time)

Mixed martial arts record

|-
|Win
|align=center|9–2
|Ricky Turcios
|Decision (unanimous)
|UFC on ESPN: dos Anjos vs. Fiziev
|
|align=center|3
|align=center|5:00
|Las Vegas, Nevada, United States
|
|-
|Win
|align=center|8–2
|Drako Rodriguez
|KO (punch)
|UFC Fight Night: Blaydes vs. Lewis
|
|align=center|1
|align=center|3:05
|Las Vegas, Nevada, United States
|
|-
|Loss
|align=center|7–2
|Vince Morales
|Decision (unanimous)
|UFC Fight Night: Iaquinta vs. Cowboy 
|
|align=center|3
|align=center|5:00
|Ottawa, Ontario, Canada
|
|-  
|Loss
|align=center|7–1
|Ricardo Ramos
|KO (spinning elbow)
|UFC 217
|
|align=center|3
|align=center|1:58
|New York City, New York, United States
|
|-
|Win
|align=center| 7–0
|Reginaldo Vieira
|Decision (unanimous)
| UFC Fight Night: Lewis vs. Browne
|
|align=center|3
|align=center|5:00
|Halifax, Nova Scotia, Canada
|
|-
|Win
|align=center|6–0
|Kyle Oliveira
|TKO (knee injury)
|Prestige FC 2
|
|align=center|1
|align=center|2:17
|Regina, Saskatchewan, Canada
|
|-
|Win
|align=center|5–0
|Jeremy Dichiara
|TKO (punches)
|Hybrid Pro Series 4
|
|align=center|1
|align=center|0:18
|Montreal, Quebec, Canada
|
|-
|Win
|align=center|4–0
|Scott Farhat
|KO (punch)
|RMMA-Rivals MMA 1
|
|align=center|1
|align=center|2:36
|Montreal, Quebec, Canada
|
|-
|Win
|align=center|3–0
|Wesley Bowman
|Submission (ankle lock)
|Hybrid Pro Series 2
|
|align=center|1
|align=center|4:40
|Gatineau, Quebec, Canada
|
|-
|Win
|align=center|2–0
|Phillip Deschambeault
|Submission (rear-naked choke)
|MMA Fight Night 1
|
|align=center|1
|align=center|2:33
|Montreal, Quebec, Canada
|
|-
|Win
|align=center|1–0
|Kyle Vivian
|Submission (punches)
|Slamm 1
|
|align=center|1
|align=center|1:28
|Montreal, Quebec, Canada
|

References

External links
 
 

1987 births
Living people
Canadian male mixed martial artists
Bantamweight mixed martial artists
Mixed martial artists utilizing Brazilian jiu-jitsu
Canadian practitioners of Brazilian jiu-jitsu
People awarded a black belt in Brazilian jiu-jitsu
Canadian people of Lebanese descent
Sportspeople from Laval, Quebec
Ultimate Fighting Championship male fighters
Sportspeople of Lebanese descent